The year 1962 involved some significant events in television. Below is a list of notable events of that year.

Events
January 1 
 The 1962 Rose Bowl game on NBC is the first coast-to-coast color television broadcast of a college football game in the United States.
 NBC introduces the Laramie Peacock before a midnight showing of Laramie.
March 24 – Boxer Benny Kid Paret falls unconscious at the hands of fellow boxer Emile Griffith during a boxing match telecast by ABC from Madison Square Garden, and officiated by Ruby Goldstein. Paret dies ten days later.
April 16 – Walter Cronkite succeeds Douglas Edwards as anchorman of the CBS Evening News; he will remain so for the next 19 years.
May 27 - General Electric Theater airs its last episode on CBS.
June 26 - Alfred Hitchcock Presents airs its last half-hour episode on NBC, before expanding to one hour on September 20 as The Alfred Hitchcock Hour on CBS.
July 6 - Gay Byrne presents the first edition of The Late Late Show on RTÉ in the Republic of Ireland. Byrne would present the show for 37 years, the longest period through which any individual has hosted a televised talk show anywhere in the world, and the show itself becomes the world's second longest-running talk show.
July 23 – First publicly available live transatlantic television broadcast via Telstar 1.
August 24 - Indonesia begins the first television broadcast with the newly inaugurated TVRI, broadcast the opening ceremony of 1962 Asian Games. TVRI is the first national television network in Indonesia before 1989. The establishment of TVRI marked as National Television Day. 
September 1 – Channel Television, the ITV franchise for the Channel Islands, goes on air.
September 9 - WNYS-TV (now WSYR-TV) signs-on the air, giving Syracuse, New York its first full-time ABC affiliate.
September 14 – Wales West and North Television (Teledu Cymru) goes on air to the North and West Wales region, extending ITV to the whole of the UK.
September 26 – Malta Television (MTV) went on the air as the very first TV station in Malta.
 Broadcast of Sábados Alegres begins, program later becomes Sábados Gigantes
 Cigarette adverts are banned from children's programmes in the UK. Actors in these adverts now have to be over 21, and connection to social success is no longer allowed. The tobacco companies also start a policy of not advertising before 9pm.
 The U.S. All-Channel Receiver Act requires UHF tuners to be on all consumer sets (channels 14 through 83), as well as VHF.
Zenith markets its first color TV, a 21" round screen set.

Programs/programmes
American Bandstand (1952–1989)
Armchair Theatre (UK) (1956–1968)
As the World Turns (1956–2010)
Ben Casey (1961–1966)
Blue Peter (UK) (1958–present)
Bonanza (1959–1973)
Bozo the Clown (1949–present)
Candid Camera (1948–present)
Captain Kangaroo (1955–1984)
Car 54, Where Are You? (1961–1963)
Come Dancing (UK) (1949–1995)
Coronation Street (UK) (1960–present)
Dennis the Menace (1959–1963)
Dixon of Dock Green (UK) (1955–1976)
Face the Nation (1954–present)
Four Corners (Australia) (1961–present)
Grandstand (UK) (1958–2007)
Gunsmoke (1955–1975)
Hallmark Hall of Fame (1951–present)
Hawaiian Eye (1959–1963)
Hazel (1961–1966)
It's Academic (1961–present)
Juke Box Jury (1959–1967, 1979, 1989–1990)
Leave It to Beaver (1957–1963)
Love of Life (1951–1980)
Meet the Press (1947–present)
Mister Ed (1961–1966)
My Three Sons (1960–1972)
Naked City (1958–1963)
Opportunity Knocks (UK) (1956–1978)
Panorama (UK) (1953–present)
Perry Mason (1957–1966)
Route 66 (1960–1964)
Search for Tomorrow (1951–1986)
The Adventures of Ozzie and Harriet (1952–1966)
The Andy Griffith Show (1960–1968)
The Avengers (UK) (1961–1969)
The Bell Telephone Hour (1959–1968)
The Dick Van Dyke Show (1961–1966)
The Donna Reed Show (1958–1966)
The Ed Sullivan Show (1948–1971)
The Edge of Night (1956–1984)
The Flintstones (1960–1966)
The Fulton Sheen Program (1961–1968)
The Good Old Days (UK) (1953–1983)
The Guiding Light (1952–2009)
The Jack Benny Show (1950–1965)
The Lawrence Welk Show (1955–1982)
The Lucy Show (1962–1968) (CBS)
The Mike Douglas Show (1961–1981)
The Milton Berle Show (1954–1967)
The Price Is Right (1956–1965)
The Real McCoys (1957–1963)
The Secret Storm (1954–1974)
The Sky at Night (UK) (1957–present)
The Today Show (1952–present)
The Tonight Show (1954–present)
The Twilight Zone (1959–1964)
The Untouchables (1959–1963)
The Voice of Firestone (1949–1963)
This Is Your Life (UK) (1955–2003)
Truth or Consequences (1950–1988)
Wagon Train (1957-1965)
Walt Disney's Wonderful World of Color (1961–1969)
What the Papers Say (UK) (1956–2008) 
What's My Line (1950–1967)
Zoo Quest (UK) (1954–1964)

Debuts
January 2 – Z-Cars (UK) on BBC Television (1962–1978)
March 8 – Oh! Those Bells on CBS (1962)
April 6 – Little Blue Light (Голубой огонёк, Goluboy ogonyok) in the Soviet Union (1962–present)
April 17 – Brothers in Law (UK) on BBC Television (1962)
July 6 – The Late Late Show (Ireland) on RTÉ (1962–present)
September 3 – The Hanna-Barbera New Cartoon Series on Syndication (1962–1963) 
September 19 – The Virginian on NBC, beginning a nine-year run, and is the first western to air in 90-minute installments (1962–1971)
September 21 – Don't Call Me Charlie! on NBC (1962–1963)
September 23 – Ensign O'Toole on NBC (1962–1963); The Jetsons on ABC, the first program to air in color on the network (1962–1963, 1984–1985, 1987)
September 26 – The Beverly Hillbillies premieres on CBS (1962–1971)
October 1 – The Lucy Show on CBS (1962–1968); The Tonight Show Starring Johnny Carson on NBC (1962–1992); Discovery on ABC  (1962–1971)
October 2 – Combat! on ABC (1962–1967)
October 4 – The Saint (UK) on ITV (1962–1969)
October 11 – McHale's Navy on ABC (1962–1966)
December 10- Bonne Nuit les Petits on RTF (France) and Ici Radio-Canada Télé (Canada) 
December 31 – Match Game on NBC (1962–1969, 1973–1984, 1990–1991, 1998–1999, 2016–present)
To Tell the Truth on CTV (1962–1964)

Ending this year

Births

Deaths

Television debuts
Dom DeLuise – The Shari Lewis Show
Peter Fonda – Naked City
Charles Nelson Reilly – Car 54, Where Are You?

See also
 1962–63 United States network television schedule

References